Abu 'Abdallāh al-Husayn ibn Sa'id ibn Hamdan was a member of the Hamdanid dynasty, grandson of its founder, Hamdan ibn Hamdun, and cousin of the emirs Nasir al-Dawla and Sayf al-Dawla.

In 944, he was sent by Nasir al-Dawla to seize Syria, allocated to the Hamdanids by the amir al-umara Tuzun, from the forces of Muhammad ibn Tughj al-Ikhshid. Husayn was initially successful in occupying the north of the country, but was soon driven out of Syria by Ikhshidid forces, led by al-Ikhshid himself. Husayn married Sarirah, a former slave of Ibn Ra'iq.

References

Sources 
 

10th-century Arabs
Husayn